Australia's National Reserve System (NRS) is a network of more than 10,000 Commonwealth plus state and territory protected areas which, in combination, on a national scale, protect more than , greater than 17% of the continent, of unique biodiversity and most significant ecological landscapes for future generations. The aim of the NRS is protect the diversity of all native landscapes, flora and fauna across Australia through strategic habitat protection. It consists of public, indigenous and privately protected areas of land and inland freshwaters. 

As part of the National Reserve System Cooperative Program, the Interim Biogeographic Regionalisation for Australia framework was developed as a planning tool to assist in identifying areas of priority.

Protected areas on private lands 
Privately protected areas consist of privately owned areas where owners have entered into "in perpetuity" covenants which are governed by  the various legislative Act of the states, territories and commonwealth of Australia. Consequent to these laws, states, territories and commonwealth maintain registers of the lands and their covenants. See for example the NSW register.

History
The move by the Australian Government to establish this National Reserve System was triggered by the international Convention on Biological Diversity, as part of the nation's commitment to fulfilling the objectives of that convention.  In particular, after signing and ratifying the convention in 1992 the then Prime Minister, Paul Keating, announced 

Within the first 4 years (1992–1996) $11.2 million was spent establishing the system and, with the cooperation and agreement of the Australian States and territories 5,600 properties (covering almost ) were included within the system and a new Indigenous Protected Area (IPA) program was initiated to include some of the most valuable and rare ecological landscapes on Indigenous Australian owned lands.  17 Indigenous Protected Area were declared by 2003 which significantly added to the NRS.

Within the next 10 years (1996–2007), with further substantial investment (through a National Heritage Trust) an additional  were added to the National Reserve System, two thirds of which were Indigenous Protected Areas.  During this time, starting in 1999, Tasmania took a lead investing in partnerships to create protected areas on other private lands; and by 2005 all the states and territories re-affirmed their joint commitment to what was to be described as a national 'flagship in biodiversity conservation'.

The National Reserve System continues to be an Australian Government priority, with continuing funding "target[ing] areas with low levels of protection, including the sub-tropical savanna from Cape York to the Kimberley, the Mitchell grass country of north-west Queensland and arid central Australia; continuing investment in indigenous protected areas; plus a new National Reserve System strategy identifying priorities and actions to be taken over the next 20 years.

Appraisal
The NRS has been praised by the WWF Australia as a successful, cost-effective conservation measure. CSIRO modelling has concluded that the NRS will be an important conservation tool to combat the effects of climate change in Australia on the environment.

See also

 Indigenous Protected Area 
 Protected areas of Australia
 Protected areas of the Australian Capital Territory
 Protected areas of New South Wales
 Protected areas of the Northern Territory
 Protected areas of Queensland
 Protected areas of South Australia
 Protected areas of Tasmania
 Protected areas of Victoria
 Protected areas of Western Australia
 Wild rivers

References

Protected areas of Australia